The 22401 / 02 Delhi Sarai Rohilla–Udhampur AC Express is a Superfast Express train belonging to Indian Railways – Northern Railway zone that runs between Delhi Sarai Rohilla and  in India.

It operates as train number 22401 from Delhi Sarai Rohilla to Udhampur and as train number 22402 in the reverse direction, serving the states of Delhi, Haryana, Punjab and Jammu and Kashmir.

Coaches

The 22401 / 02 Delhi Sarai Rohilla–Udhampur AC Express has a total of 19 coaches, which include 1 AC 1st Class, 5 AC 2 tier, 11  AC 3 tier & 2 End-on generator coaches. It does not carry a pantry car.

As is customary with most train services in India, coach composition may be amended at the discretion of Indian Railways depending on demand.

Service

As the average speed of the train is above , as per Indian Railways rules, its fare includes a Superfast surcharge.

Routeing

The 22401 / 02 Delhi Sarai Rohilla–Udhampur AC Express runs from Delhi Sarai Rohilla via , Ambala Cantt Junction,  to Udhampur.

Traction

Upon introduction due to partial electrification of the route, the train was hauled end to end by a Tughlakabad-based WDM-3A / WDP-4.

Due to progressive electrification, it is now hauled by a WAP-4 or WAP-7 from Ghaziabad shed.

Operation

22401 Delhi Sarai Rohilla–Udhampur AC Express leaves Delhi Sarai Rohilla every Monday, Wednesday & Saturday arriving Udhampur the next day.
22402 Udhampur–Delhi Sarai Rohilla AC Express leaves Udhampur every Tuesday, Thursday & Sunday arriving Delhi Sarai Rohilla the next day.

References 

 https://www.youtube.com/watch?v=fvm-6-cb-Gw
 http://archive.indianexpress.com/news/four-new-trains-for-delhi-this-year/923940/
 https://web.archive.org/web/20140714195826/http://www.jknewspoint.com/newsdet.aspx?q=11646

External links

Rail transport in Delhi
Rail transport in Haryana
Rail transport in Punjab, India
Rail transport in Jammu and Kashmir
AC Express (Indian Railways) trains
Transport in Udhampur
Transport in Delhi